Terminalia volucris, commonly known as rosewood, is a tree of the family Combretaceae native to northern Australia.

It blooms between June and December producing white-cream-yellow flowers.

It is found in the Kimberley region of Western Australia growing in sandy-clay soils over basalt or sandstone.

References

volucris
Trees of Australia
Flora of the Northern Territory
Rosids of Western Australia
Plants described in 1864
Taxa named by George Bentham